Tomato Red (also known as Tomato Red: Blood Money) is a 2017 Irish-Canadian crime film written and directed by Juanita Wilson and starring Jake Weary and Julia Garner. It is based on the novel of the same name by Daniel Woodrell.

Plot
Sammy is released from prison and moves into a trailer and gets a low level job. On Friday he goes to a bar, starts drinking, and befriends some locals. After spending the weekend with them smoking meth, they convince him to break into a wealthy family's house. The car that takes him to the house abandons him, as he drinks liquor and passes out.

He awakens to find himself tied to a chair, by brother and sister, Jammalee and Jason. They act as though it is their house and eventually untie him. When the police show up, all three flee. Jammalee invites Sammy to her trailer but he returns to his trailer instead. He confronts the people who abandoned him, beating a man and getting his belongings. He then decides to go to Jammalee's.

Sammy ends up living with Jammalee and Jason in their brother's room who is currently incarcerated. Their mother, Bev lives in a home next to theirs and works as a prostitute. Sammy befriends all three. Sammy and the two siblings continue to break into wealthy people's homes and blackmail them with information they find. This eventually leads to Jason being murdered. A local police officer pays them off with $5,500, instructing them to leave it alone. He claims people just wanted to beat Jason in order to send him a message but things got out of hand. Soon after, Jammalee leaves town alone and Sammy confronts and fights the townspeople.

Cast
 Julia Garner as Jamalee Merridew
 Jake Weary as Sammy
 Anna Friel as Bev Merridew
 Nick Roux as Jason Merridew

Reception
On the review aggregator Rotten Tomatoes, the film has a 67% rating, based on 6 reviews.  
Paddy Kehoe of RTÉ.ie awarded the film four stars out of five.  Donald Clarke of The Irish Times awarded it three stars out of five.  Gwilyn Mumford of The Guardian gave the film two stars out of five.

References

External links
 
 

2017 crime thriller films
English-language Canadian films
English-language Irish films
Canadian crime thriller films
Irish crime thriller films
Films based on American novels
2010s English-language films
2010s Canadian films